Mary Ryan Munisteri  was an American television soap opera writer. She was head writer of Ryan's Hope (1982–83), Guiding Light (1986), and Loving (1991). She wrote Mandy's Grandmother, a children special, which aired in 1981.     She has three children, Matt Munisteri (musician), Ben Munisteri (choreographer), and Adele Munisteri (yoga teacher). She died on January 29, 2022.

Positions held
Guiding Light
 Head writer: May 1986-October 1986

Loving
 Head writer: August 1991-December 1991

Ryan's Hope
 Head writer: August 1982 - January 1983
 Associate head writer: August 1975 -  July 1982,  January 1983– May 1984

Awards and nominations
Daytime Emmy Awards

Wins
(1977, 1978, 1979, 1980, 1983 & 1984; Best Writing; Ryan's Hope)
(1981; Best Writing; Mandy's Grandmother)

Writers Guild of America Award

Wins
(1976, 1977, 1978, 1979, 1981, 1982, 1983 & 1984 seasons; Ryan's Hope)

Nominations 
(1980 season; Ryan's Hope)

Connection to Ryan's Hope
Mary Ryan Munisteri was friends with Claire Labine and the inspirational namesake for the character of "Mary Ryan" from Ryan's Hope.

Head Writer Tenure

References

External links

1939 births
2022 deaths
American soap opera writers
Place of birth missing
Writers Guild of America Award winners